The 653d Aircraft Control and Warning Squadron is an inactive United States Air Force unit. It was last assigned to the Oklahoma City Air Defense Sector, Air Defense Command, stationed at England Air Force Base, Louisiana. It was inactivated on 1 August 1963.

The unit was a General Surveillance Radar squadron providing for the air defense of the United States.

Lineage
 Established as 653d Aircraft Control and Warning Squadron
 Activated on 8 December 1949
 Inactivated on 6 February 1952
 Activated on 18 June 1953
 Inactivated on 1 August 1963

Assignments
 540th Aircraft Control and Warning Group, 8 December 1949 - 6 February 1952
 33d Air Division, 18 June 1953
 Oklahoma City Air Defense Sector, 1 January 1960
 4752d Air Defense Wing, 1 September 1961
 Oklahoma City Air Defense Sector, 25 June – 1 August 1963

Stations
 Stewart AFB, NY, 8 December 1949 - 6 February 1952
 Tinker AFB, OK, 18 June 1953
 Alexandria AFB, LA, 1 November 1954 (renamed England AFB 23 June 1955) – 1 August 1963

References

  Cornett, Lloyd H. and Johnson, Mildred W., A Handbook of Aerospace Defense Organization  1946 - 1980,  Office of History, Aerospace Defense Center, Peterson AFB, CO (1980.
 Winkler, David F. & Webster, Julie L., Searching the Skies, The Legacy of the United States Cold War Defense Radar Program,  US Army Construction Engineering Research Laboratories, Champaign, IL (1997).

External links

Radar squadrons of the United States Air Force
Aerospace Defense Command units
1949 establishments in New York (state)
1963 disestablishments in Louisiana